The Mistratoan yellow-shouldered bat (Sturnira mistratensis), is a species of leaf-nosed bat indigenous to the Cordillera Occidental, in the Mistrato municipality in Risaralda, Colombia. Since existing information derives exclusively from the holotype, the status of the species, its environmental requirements, and the trend of the population are unknown.

See also
List of mammals of Colombia

References

Sturnira
Bats of South America
Mammals of Colombia
Endemic fauna of Colombia
Mammals described in 2000